In algebraic topology, homological connectivity is a property describing a topological space based on its homology groups.

Definitions

Background 
X is homologically-connected if its 0-th homology group equals Z, i.e. , or equivalently, its 0-th reduced homology group is trivial: . 

Therefore, homological connectivity is equivalent to the graph having a single connected component, which is equivalent to graph connectivity. It is similar to the notion of a connected space.

X is homologically 1-connected if it is homologically-connected, and additionally, its 1-th homology group is trivial, i.e. . 

 For example, when X is a connected graph with vertex-set V and edge-set E, . Therefore, homological 1-connectivity is equivalent to the graph being a tree. Informally, it corresponds to X having no "holes" with a 1-dimensional boundary, which is similar to the notion of a simply connected space.

In general, for any integer k, X is homologically k-connected if its reduced homology groups of order 0, 1, ..., k are all trivial. Note that the reduced homology group equals the homology group for 1,..., k (only the 0-th reduced homology group is different).

Connectivity 
The homological connectivity of X, denoted connH(X), is the largest k ≥ 0 for which X is homologically k-connected. Examples:

 If all reduced homology groups of X are trivial, then connH(X) = infinity. This holds, for example, for any ball.
 If the 0th group is trivial but the 1th group is not, then connH(X) = 0. This holds, for example, for a connected graph with a cycle.
 If all reduced homology groups are non-trivial, then connH(X) = -1. This holds for any disconnected space.
 The connectivity of the empty space is, by convention, connH(X) = -2. 

Some computations become simpler if the connectivity is defined with an offset of 2, that is, . The eta of the empty space is 0, which is its smallest possible value. The eta of any disconnected space is 1.

Dependence on the field of coefficients 
The basic definition considers homology groups with integer coefficients. Considering homology groups with other coefficients leads to other definitions of connectivity. For example, X is F2-homologically 1-connected if its 1st homology group with coefficients from F2 (the cyclic field of size 2) is trivial, i.e.: .

Homological connectivity in specific spaces 
For homological connectivity of simplicial complexes, see simplicial homology. Homological connectivity was calculated for various spaces, including:

 The independence complex of a graph;
 A random 2-dimensional simplicial complex;
 A random k-dimensional simplicial complex;
 A random hypergraph;
 A random Čech complex.

Relation with homotopical connectivity 

For any X that is simply-connected, that is, the connectivities are the same:If X is not simply-connected, then inequality holds:but it may be strict. See Homotopical connectivity.

See also 
Meshulam's game is a game played on a graph G, that can be used to calculate a lower bound on the homological connectivity of the independence complex of G.

References 

Homology theory
Properties of topological spaces